Manitoga was the estate and modernist home of industrial designer Russel Wright (1904–1976) and his wife Mary Small Einstein Wright. It is located along New York State Route 9D south of Garrison, New York, a short distance north of the Bear Mountain Bridge.

Wright named his masterful synthesis of architecture and nature Manitoga after Algonquin words meaning "place of great spirit". Today, the home, studio and surrounding woodland garden, together known as Dragon Rock, uniquely convey Wright's enduring ideas about good design and living in harmony with nature.

The property was listed on the National Register of Historic Places in 1996. In 2006 the Department of the Interior designated it a National Historic Landmark, the only one to date in Putnam County. Manitoga is a member of the National Trust's Historic Artists' Homes and Studios program and a 2012 World Monuments Watch Site. It is one of the few modern homes open to the public in New York State.

History
Wright and his wife Mary Small Einstein Wright acquired the property in 1942.
The  had been devastated by previous logging and quarrying, common in the Hudson Highlands in the early 20th century. The couple designed the property with sustainability in mind, a concept not widely applied at the time. In his reclamation efforts, Wright redirected a mountain stream and designed a  multi-level waterfall to transform an abandoned quarry pit into a swimming pond. In addition to trees, streams, boulders, moss and native plants, his woodland landscape design incorporated stone steps, terraces and bridges.

Following Mary's death in 1952, Wright built his experimental home and studio directly into the rock ledge of the quarry. In an effort to blend in with Nature, the structures have green roofs, built-in elements and expansive walls of glass, offering dramatic views of the waterfall and surrounding landscape.

Access
Manitoga includes  of walking trails that Wright designed, with numerous plantings. The trails connect with the Appalachian Trail alongside the neighboring ridge of Canada Hill in Hudson Highlands State Park via the Osborne Loop. The outer trails are open to the public daily until sunset. Guided tours of the house and landscape are offered May through early November.

Gallery

See also
National Register of Historic Places listings in Putnam County, New York
List of National Historic Landmarks in New York

References

"Russel Wright and Modern America", by James Zemaitis, in ArtNet Magazine - (Accessed 8/29/2007)

Further reading
D. J. Huppatz, Revisiting Russel Wright's Manitoga. Landscape Journal published by: University of Wisconsin Press, Vol. 32, No. 1 (2013), pp. 19–34.

External links

Manitoga / The Russel Wright Design Center
Russel Wright Studios Home Page

Museums in Putnam County, New York
Historic house museums in New York (state)
Gardens in New York (state)
Biographical museums in New York (state)
Protected areas of the Hudson Highlands
Houses on the National Register of Historic Places in New York (state)
National Historic Landmarks in New York (state)
Artists' studios in the United States
Houses in Putnam County, New York
Modernist architecture in New York (state)
National Register of Historic Places in Putnam County, New York
Woodland gardens